David Helwig  (April 5, 1938 – October 16, 2018) was a Canadian editor, essayist, memoirist, novelist, poet, short story writer and translator.

Life and career
Helwig was born in Toronto, Ontario, where he spent his early childhood years. When he was ten years old, his family moved to Niagara-on-the-Lake, Ontario, where his father ran a small business repairing and refinishing furniture and buying and selling antiques. He earned a B.A. from the University of Toronto in 1960, and an M.A. from the University of Liverpool in 1962. He subsequently taught at Queen's University from 1962 to 1974. While he at Queen's University, he also taught writing classes in Collins Bay Penitentiary. In 1972, he co-wrote A Book about Billie with an inmate of the prison.

In 1971, he founded and was long-time editor of the Best Canadian Stories anthology series for Oberon Press. From 1974 to 1976, he was the literary manager for CBC Television's drama department. In 1980, he retired from teaching and became a full-time writer.

His work includes a series of novels set in Kingston, Ontario, known as "The Kingston Novels": The Glass Knight, Jennifer, A Sound Like Laughter, and It is Always Summer. His best known poem, "Considerations", was published in Maclean's in 1970. His poetry collections have received numerous awards, including the CBC poetry award for Catchpenny Poems (1983) and the Atlantic Poetry Award for The Year One (2004). As an adult, Helwig learned Russian and published two books of translations of short stories by Anton Chekhov which included About Love (short story).

He lived his later years in Belfast, Prince Edward Island with his wife, Judy Gaudet. His daughter, Maggie Helwig, is a noted writer and social justice activist in  Toronto.

In 2007, he received the Matt Cohen Award from the Writers' Trust of Canada in honor of his lifetime contribution to Canadian literature. On January 23, 2008, he was appointed Prince Edward Island's third Poet Laureate and on July 1, 2009 he was named a Member of the Order of Canada. 

Helwig died on October 16, 2018, at the age of 80 at a hospital in Montague, Prince Edward Island.

Works by David Helwig

Poetry
 Figures in a Landscape, 1968
 The Sign of the Gunman, 1969
 The Best Name of Silence, 1972
 Atlantic Crossings, 1974
 Book of the Hours, 1979
 The Rain Falls Like Rain, 1982
 Catchpenny Poems, 1983
 The Hundred Old Names, 1989
 The Beloved, 1992
 A Random Gospel, 1996
 This Human Day, 2000
 Telling Stories, 2000
 The Year One, 2004
 The Sway of Otherwise, 2008
 Seawrack, 2013
 Keeping Late Hours, 2015
 Sudden and Absolute Stranger, 2017
 A House in Memory: Last Poems, 2020

Fiction
 The Streets of Summer, 1969 (short stories)
 The Day Before Tomorrow, 1971 (titled Message from a Spy in 1975 printing)
 The Glass Knight, 1976
 Jennifer, 1979
 The King's Evil, 1981
 It Is Always Summer, 1982
 A Sound Like Laughter, 1983
 The Only Son, 1984
 The Bishop, 1986
 A Postcard from Rome, 1988
 Old Wars, 1989
 Of Desire, 1990
 Blueberry Cliffs, 1993 (novella)
 Just Say the Words, 1994
 Close to the Fire, 1999 (novella)
 The Time of Her Life, 2000
 The Stand-In, 2002 (novella)
 Duet, 2004 (novella)
 Saltsea, 2006
 Smuggling Donkeys, 2007 (novella)
 Coming Through, 2007 (three novellas)
 Mystery Stories, 2010 (short stories)
 Killing McGee, 2011 (novella)
 Simon Says, 2012
 Clyde, 2014

Other
 A Book About Billie, 1972 (documentary) (as Inside and Out, 1975)
 Last Stories of Anton Chekhov, 1991 (as translator)
 The Child of Someone, 1997 (essays)
 Living Here, 2001 (essays)
 The Names of Things, 2006 (memoir) 
 About Love, 2012 (as translator)
 The Essential Tom Marshall, 2012 (co-edited with Michael Ondaatje)

See also

Canadian literature
Canadian poetry
List of Canadian poets

References

Further reading
 Marshall, Tom. Harsh and Lovely Land: The Major Canadian Poets and the Making of a Canadian Tradition. UBC Press, Vancouver, BC, 1979. 
 Ruthig, Ingrid, ed. David Helwig: Essays on His Works. Guernica Editions, Toronto, ON, 2018. Introduction, essays, interview, reviews by: George Fetherling, Douglas Glover, D.G. Jones, Simon Lloyd, Tom Marshall, Rob McLennan, Shane Neilson, Ingrid Ruthig, Mark Sampson, and Lorraine M. York.

External links
 David Helwig
David Helwig's  entry in The Canadian Encyclopedia

1938 births
2018 deaths
Canadian male novelists
Canadian male poets
Members of the Order of Canada
20th-century Canadian male writers
20th-century Canadian novelists
20th-century Canadian poets
21st-century Canadian male writers
21st-century Canadian novelists
21st-century Canadian poets
University of Toronto alumni
Writers from Prince Edward Island
Writers from Toronto
Poets Laureate of places in Canada